José Gil de Gouveia Beltrão (27 November 1905 – 1948) was a Portuguese horse rider. At the 1936 Olympics he and his horse Biscuit won a team bronze medal in show jumping after finishing sixth individually.

References

1905 births
1948 deaths
Equestrians at the 1936 Summer Olympics
Olympic bronze medalists for Portugal
Olympic equestrians of Portugal
Portuguese male equestrians
Show jumping riders
Olympic medalists in equestrian
Medalists at the 1936 Summer Olympics
Sportspeople from Lisbon